The year 1695 in science and technology involved some significant events.

Events
 Gottfried Leibniz publishes his "New System of the Nature and Communication of Substances".
 Denis Papin moves from Marburg to Kassel and publishes Recueil de diverses pièces touchant quelques machines.

Births
 February 2 – William Borlase, Cornish naturalist (died 1772)
 February 6 – Nicolaus II Bernoulli, Swiss mathematician (died 1726)
 May 3 – Henri Pitot, Italian-born French engineer (died 1771)
 August 4 – William Oliver, Cornish-born English physician (died 1764)
 November 10 – John Bevis, English physician and astronomer (died 1771)

Deaths
 January 26 - Johann Jakob Wepfer, Swiss pathologist and pharmacologist (born 1620)
 July 8 – Christiaan Huygens, Dutch mathematician and physicist (born 1629)
 December 30 – Samuel Morland, English inventor (born 1625)

References

 
17th century in science
1690s in science